State Route 715 (SR 715) is an east–west state highway in the central portion of the U.S. state of Ohio. Near its eastern terminus, SR 715 crosses over the top of the Mohawk Dam.

Route description
SR 715 travels through eastern Knox County and western Coshocton County.  There is no portion of SR 715 that is included within the National Highway System.

History
The highway was first designated in 1939.  When it was first designated, SR 715 was routed along the current path of US 36 between the two current endpoints of SR 715.  During this time, US 36 was routed along the current path of SR 715.  In 1962, US 36 and SR 715 swapped alignments, such that US 36 now followed the southern alignment, and SR 715 the northern alignment between the two junctions, as each does to this day.  Since then, SR 715 has not experienced any changes of major significance to its routing.

Major intersections

References

715
Transportation in Knox County, Ohio
Transportation in Coshocton County, Ohio